Witherup Bridge is a historic Pratt pony truss bridge located in Clinton Township, Venango County, Pennsylvania. It was built by the Canton Bridge Company in 1906.  It measures  and crosses the Scrubgrass Creek.

It was listed on the National Register of Historic Places in 1988.

References

Road bridges on the National Register of Historic Places in Pennsylvania
Bridges completed in 1906
Truss bridges in the United States
Bridges in Venango County, Pennsylvania
National Register of Historic Places in Venango County, Pennsylvania
1906 establishments in Pennsylvania